The first and original Rhinoceros Party of Canada fielded 116 candidates in the 1980 federal election, none of whom were elected. One candidate finished second. One finished third. Some who finished fourth beat the NDP, and are mentioned. Others who placed fourth beat Social Credit, there were only four candidates on the ballot, or there was a wide field of fringe parties.

Alberta
All Alberta Rhino candidates but one came in fourth, for a number of reasons.

Samoil, Willy (Calgary Centre) 766 votes 
Finished 4th.

Pazdor, Philip J. (Calgary East) 638 votes 
Finished 4th.

Williams, Mike (Calgary North) 878 votes 
Finished 4th.

Lambe, David E. Fred (Calgary South) 887 votes 
Finished 4th.

Petti, Anthony G. (Calgary West) 1,027 votes 
Finished 4th.

Walker, Dave (Edmonton-Strathcona) 453 votes 
Finished 4th.

Cavanagh, Allan G. W. (Peace River) 547 votes 
Finished 4th.

Hohol, Carl M. (Vegreville) 359 votes

British Columbia
B.C. Rhino candidates generally ran against a wide field of minority parties and independent candidates. They came fourth in all but one riding contested.

Schaller, Richard The Troll (Capilano) 688 votes 
Finished 4th.

Lesosky, Louis Crowbird (Cowichan-Malhat-The Islands) 444 votes 
Finished 4th.

Maddocks, Bob (Esquimalt-Saanich) 548 votes

Storey, Kyle (Kamloops-Shuswap) 237 votes 
Finished 4th.

Coffey, Frank Tee Pee Red (Nanaimo-Alberni) 591 votes 
Finished 4th.

Kruger, Andre The Rock (Okanagan-Similkameen) 317 votes

Courchene, Albert The Cad (Surrey-White Rock-North Delta) 440 votes 
Finished 4th.

Longworth, David J. (Vancouver Centre) 337 votes 
Finished 4th.

Lyttle, Dandy Randy (Vancouver East) 198 votes 
Finished 4th.

McDonald, Verne John Eh (Vancouver Quadra) 405 votes 
Finished 4th.

Fleming, Linda (Vancouver South) 327 votes 
Finished 4th.

Higgins, Rhino Kirk (Victoria) 446 votes 
Finished 4th.

Manitoba
Manitoban Rhino candidates were generally uncontested for fourth.

Campbell, Roland ([formerly] Churchill) 352 votes 
Finished 4th.

Feilburg, Lawrence (Provencher) 433 votes 
Finished 4th.

Bergen, Honest Don (Winnipeg-Birds Hill) 322 votes 
Finished 4th.

Balderstone, Smilin Dave (Winnipeg-Fort Garry) 405 votes 
Finished 4th.

New Brunswick

Boucher, Amede Le Terrible ( [formerly] Gloucester) 362 votes

Boudreau, Jules Cesar ([formerly] Gloucester) 736 votes 
Both candidates combined and Boudreau himself ranked 4th.

Doucet, Arthur (Restigouche) 692 votes 
Finished 4th.

Nova Scotia

Moors, Mark ([formerly] Annapolis Valley-Hants) 343 votes 
Finished 4th.

Tudor, Martha ([formerly] South Shore) 433 votes 
Finished 4th.

Ontario

Reid, David J. (Beaches) 214 votes

Butterfield, Vicki ([formerly] Broadview—Greenwood)
Butterfield, wife of noted computer expert Jim Butterfield, ran a low-profile campaign.  The Rhinoceros Party announced that she was "following the lead of another, more prominent candidate, and is hiding from the public".  This was likely a reference to Liberal leader Pierre Trudeau.  She received 196 votes (0.61%), finishing fourth against New Democratic Party incumbent Bob Rae.

Thorning, Steve (Guelph) 272 votes 
Finished 4th.

Sabzali, James E. S. (Hamilton West) 304 votes 
Finished 4th.

Sharp, Edward T. (Kingston and the Islands) 373 votes 
Finished 4th.

Wright, Douglas (Kitchener) 292 votes

Showers, Stewart (London West) 224 votes 
Finished 4th.

Cockerell, Alan (Nepean-Carleton) 658 votes 
Finished 4th.

Stranart, J. C. (Ontario) 313 votes 
Finished 4th.

Langille, David (Ottawa Centre) 358 votes 
Finished 4th.

Ashby, Graham Prickes (Ottawa-Vanier) 519 votes 
Finished 4th.

Elson, Mark ([formerly] Peterborough) 243 votes

Yates, Geoff ([formerly] Rosedale) 319 votes 
Finished 4th.

Douglas, John (Spadina) 250 votes 
Finished 4th.

Pileggi, Salvatore (Spadina) 146 votes

Lake, Fred Horny (St. Catharines) 230 votes 
Finished 4th.

Armour, Liza (St. Paul's) 311 votes

Lalonde, Raymond (Sudbury) 288 votes 
Finished 4th.

Nigol, Rick (Waterloo) 330 votes 
Finished 4th.

Matheson, John (York East) 237 votes

Oliver, Mark (York-Peel) 589 votes 
Finished 4th.

Québec

Lambert, Germain (Beauce) 624 votes 
Finished 4th, beat the NDP (404 votes)

Chabot, Andree (Bellechasse) 815 votes 
Finished 4th, beat the NDP (730 votes)

Des Gagne, Ti-Pit Claude (Berthier—Maskinongé) 728 votes 
Finished 3rd behind the Liberals and the Progressive Conservatives. NDP did not run a candidate.

Grenier, Philippe Sarto (Blainville-Deux Montagnes) 1,685 votes

Leblanc, Louis Philippe Tulipe (Bonaventure-Iles-De-La-Madeleine) 917 votes

Michaud, Helene (Chambly) 1,724 votes 
Finished 4th.

Bernard, Denis Van ([formerly] Charlesbourg) 3,066 votes 
Finished 4th.

Laliberté, Guy Pantouffe (Charlevoix) 945 votes 
Guy Laliberté Later went on to found Cirque de Soleil

Vaillancourt, Pierre Elliot (Duvernay) 2,479 votes

Antonyszyn, Polack Eugene (Gamelin) 1,640 votes 
Finished 4th.

Mainville, Francis Vitesse (Gaspe) 759 votes

Penzes, Francois R. (Gatineau) 640 votes 
Finished 4th.

Gougeon, Diane (Hochelaga-Maisonneuve) 1,412 votes 
Finished 4th.

Dompierre, Sylvain ([formerly] Hull) 598 votes 
Finished 4th.

Guay, Raymond (Kamouraska—Rivière-du-Loup) 349 votes

Lapierre, Andre Constance (Kamouraska—Rivière-du-Loup) 358 votes 
The combined vote of the two candidates was enough to rank 4th.

Collin, Gaston (Labelle) 664 votes

Gagnon, Richard Amouthd (Labelle) 331 votes

Morin, Jean-Marie (Labelle) 580 votes 
The combined vote of the three candidates was enough to rank 4th.

Briand, Beru Louis (Lac-Saint-Jean) 1,159 votes

Baribeau, Jean Serge (Lachine) 692 votes 
Finished 4th.

Lefebvre, Jean Obelix ([formerly] Langelier) 2,813 votes 
Finished 4th, beat the NDP

Ferron, Jacques (Laprairie) 1,868 votes 
The late Jacques Ferron is a decorated Québec cultural hero. Ranked 4th.

Cote, Sonia Chatouille (Laurier) 3,067 votes 
Finished 2nd, beat the PC Party and the NDP.

Bonnier, Jean Chat Botte (Laval) 1,679 votes 
Finished 4th.

Bonnier, Alain Bugs (Laval-Des-Rapides) 2,152 votes 
Finished 4th.

Richard, Gervais Prime (Levis) 2,652 votes

Brunet, Jean-Marc Cornelius ([formerly] Longueuil) 2,631 votes

Regimbauld, Paul (Lotbiniere) 3,041 votes

Ouellet, François (Louis-Hebert) 3,795 votes 
Finished 4th.

Bedard, Denis Tarzan (Manicouagan) 715 votes

Truchon, Yves (Manicouagan) 841 votes 
The combined vote of the two candidates was enough to rank 4th, but not enough to beat the NDP.

Belair, Michel (Matapedia-Matane) 892 votes 
Finished 4th, beat the NDP by 4 votes.

Gavroche, Gosselin D. (Megantic-Compton-Stanstead) 1,002 votes

De Blois, Piggy Guy (Mercier) 1,835 votes

Gingras, Pierre Screwdriver (Missisquoi) 687 votes 
Finished 4th.

Theriault, Face-Bleme Jacques (Montmorency) 1,913 votes 
Finished 4th.

Rivard, Michel Flybin (Mount Royal) 715 votes 
Finished 4th.

Roy, Cherubin Guy (Notre-Dame-de-Grâce) 900 votes 
Finished 4th.

Langlois, Philippe (Outremont) 2,065 votes 
Finished 4th.

Harvey, La Mule Louis (Papineau) 1,608 votes 
Finished 4th.

Beauregard, Gaston Lagaffe (Pontiac-Gatineau-Labelle) 643 votes 
Finished 4th.

Paquette, J. Chretin ([formerly] Portneuf) 1,634 votes

Pollender, Raymond Patrotrovitch (Québec-Est) 1,862 votes

Moreau, Helene ([formerly] Richelieu) 1,215 votes

Caron, Denys (Richmond) 876 votes

Saintonge, Jacques (Rimouski) 627 votes

Simard, Donald Bobette (Roberval) 503 votes

Tremblay, G. Mara ([formerly] Rosemont) 1,310 votes 
Finished 4th.

Rose, Serge (Saint-Denis) 1,232 votes 
Finished 4th.

Montpetit, Jean-Guy (Saint-Henri-Westmount) 1,140 votes 
Finished 4th.

Chamberland, Andre (Saint-Hyacinthe) 868 votes

Tremblay, Rodrigue Chocolat (Saint Jacques) 1,080 votes 
Finished 4th.

Arene, Jean-Luc (Saint-Jean) 982 votes

Guzzo-Ceros (Saint-Leonard-Anjou) 1,569 votes 
Finished 4th.

Favreau, Francois Straight (Sainte-Marie) 1,659 votes 
Finished 4th.

De Vernal, J. F. Le Calife (Saint-Maurice) 1,206 votes

Chaput, Benoit Yodepech (Saint-Michel) 1,603 votes

Brazeau, Cornelius Andre (Shefford) 1,274 votes 
Finished 4th.

Bedard, Fernand (Sherbrooke) 909 votes

Massicotte, Michel Celestin ([formerly] Temiscamingue) 1,206 votes

Drapeau, Pedro Gervais G. D. (Terrebonne) 1,844 votes

Mignault, Hughe Le Brulot (Vercheres) 2,804 votes 
Finished 4th.

Cawthorn, Ronald (Verdun) 1,141 votes 
Finished 4th.

Saskatchewan

Bowden, Ross Dunning (Kindersley-Lloydminster) 294 votes 
Finished 4th.

Hoover, Derron H. X. (Regina East) 302 votes 
Finished 4th.

References

Rhinoceros Party of Canada candidates in the 1980 Canadian federal election